Shamil Rural District is a rural district (dehestan) in the Takht District of Bandar Abbas County, Hormozgan Province, Iran. At the 2006 census, its population was 22,280, in 4,949 families.  The rural district has 55 villages.

References 

Rural Districts of Hormozgan Province
Bandar Abbas County